Ucolta is a locality in the Mid North region of South Australia. It is named for a railway station on the Broken Hill-Port Pirie railway line. Trains no longer stop at Ucolta. It is also where the Barrier Highway first meets the railway line, and the Wilmington–Ucolta Road which connects across the northern side of the Mid North, providing the shortest road route from Western Australia and Eyre Peninsula via Port Augusta to Broken Hill and New South Wales.

The name Ucolta was recorded as a native name in 1862, but its meaning has been lost.
The former Ucolta Post Office was in the railway station.

Lancelot
A town named Lancelot was surveyed in April 1877. Nothing now remains of the town except the cemetery, and the state government declared that it had ceased to exist on 22 May 1980. Lancelot cemetery remains managed by the District Council of Peterborough.

It had been anticipated that the railway north from Terowie would pass Lancelot, however the railway was built further west to meet the east-west railway at Peterborough. In the 1890s, Lancelot had both government and Catholic schools.

For the 1925 federal election, the polling booth at Lancelot was closed, with a new polling booth at Ucolta, which took a total of 49 votes.

References

Mid North (South Australia)